Božo Vrećo (born 18 October 1983) is a Bosnian musician.

Childhood 
Božo Vrećo was born in Foča, SR Bosnia and Herzegovina, SFR Yugoslavia on October 18, 1983. His father died when he was five years old, and he grew up with his mother and two sisters. His mother was an artist and encouraged Vrećo to paint and draw, as well as to learn music. He taught himself how to read and write music, as well as sing, from the Internet. As an effeminate boy, Vrećo experienced many struggles growing up in his provincial home town, and was frequently bullied.

Professional career
Vrećo went to Belgrade, Serbia to earn his master's degree in archaeology, but realized that his true passion was sevdalinka. At age 27, he began learning how to sing from traditional recordings. He then traveled to Sarajevo. A local musician discovered Vrećo singing in a café and invited him to perform in the band Halka, with whom he recorded his first CD.

Prior to his musical career, Vrećo worked as an archaeology professor. He began performing professionally with the band Halka in 2013, and gained fame within and away from the Balkans at sold-out concerts and international music festivals. Vrećo performed as the lead singer for Halka, recording two albums with them in 2013 and 2015, which resulted in a world tour. In 2014, in between recording two albums with Halka, Vrećo recorded his first solo album, Moj Sevdah, where he performed seventeen sevdalinkas in a cappella style, including two original songs. By 2015, Vrećo became known and written about in the English-speaking world. In 2017, Vrećo recorded his second solo album, Pandora, which included performances with Marko Louis, Indigo, Velahavie, and Merima Ključo.

Two songs from the album Moj Sevdah will be part of Koštana, a play directed by Kokan Mladenović. Vrećo had a leading role in the play. The Swedish national television station will produce a documentary about Vrećo, his life, and his devotion to sevdalinka.

In addition to sevdalinka, Vrećo enjoys jazz, blues and soul, and tries to bring their elements into his interpretation of sevdalinka. He is inspired by the musical artists Himzo Polovina, Selim Salihović, Emina Zečaj, and Nada Mamula.

Vrećo performs as both female and male, as he sees himself as a person of both genders. At the beginning of his career, Vrećo wore men's suits, then decided to perform as what he considers his true self. It is his belief that a person who sings songs of courage should present nothing but honesty to their audience, which is one reason why more traditional audiences love him. He takes offense at those who consider him a drag performer.

As a reviver of a traditional women's genre, Vrećo defends the place of women in Bosnian society by singing their songs. He wears his hair long, with kohl around his eyes, and dresses in kaftans, dresses, or floating coats as he spins and sings on stage. At the same time, he is a bearded man. His performances are continually sold out in the patriarchal Balkan society, and his fans cross gender and ethnic boundaries. Vrećo hopes that, through his musical performances, he can also be a voice for LGBT rights in the Balkans.

Personal life 
In some interviews, Vrećo has identified as gay, but he consistently states that he is both female and male and that he is a free person who will not hide his true self.

When he is not performing, Vrećo writes, paints, and enjoys traveling for pleasure. While he still lives in Sarajevo, he tries to go home to Foča as frequently as possible to visit his family.

Discography

Albums with Halka
Halka (2013)
O ljubavi (2014)

Solo albums
Moj sevdah (2014)
Pandora (2017)
Melek (2018)
Lacrimae (2020)

References 

Bosnia and Herzegovina musicians
Sevdalinka
1983 births
People from Foča
Gay musicians
Living people
Serbs of Bosnia and Herzegovina
Bosnia and Herzegovina LGBT people
20th-century LGBT people
21st-century LGBT people